Utah State Route 166 may refer to:

 Utah State Route 166 (1969-1990), a former state highway in the Ogden Valley in eastern Weber County, Utah, United States that connected from Utah State Route 39 in Huntsville to Eden
 Utah State Route 166 (1933-1969), a former state highway in Daggett County, Utah, United States, that connected the Ashley National Forest with Utah State Route 43 "west of Antelope Canal"

See also

 List of state highways in Utah
 List of highways numbered 166

External links

 Utah Department of Transportation Highway Resolutions: Route 166 (PDF)